Peace Olga Niyomwungere (born 20 December 2005) is a Burundian footballer who plays as a midfielder for La Colombe FC and the Burundi women's national team.

References

External links 
 

2005 births
Living people
Burundian women's footballers
Women's association football midfielders
Burundi women's international footballers